The Departmental Council of Essonne is the deliberative assembly of the Essonne department in the region of Île-de-France. It consists of 42 members (general councilors) from 21 cantons and its headquarters are in Évry-Courcouronnes.

The President of the General Council is François Durovray.

Vice-Presidents 
The President of the Departmental Council is assisted by 12 vice-presidents chosen from among the departmental advisers. Each of them has a delegation of authority.

References 

Essonne
Essonne